Taylor Ridge is a rock ridge, 10 nautical miles (18 km) long, forming a precipitous wall along the west side of Scott Glacier between the mouths of Koerwitz and Vaughan Glaciers, in the Queen Maud Mountains. Discovered by the Byrd Antarctic Expedition geological party under Quin Blackburn in 1934. Named by Advisory Committee on Antarctic Names (US-ACAN) for John H. Taylor, ionospheric physicist with the South Pole Station winter party, 1966.

See also
Mount Sletten

References

Ridges of the Ross Dependency
Amundsen Coast